Zukhrabkent is a rural locality (a selo) in Shikhikentsky Selsoviet, Suleyman-Stalsky District, Republic of Dagestan, Russia. The population was 245 as of 2010. There are 2 streets.

Geography 
It is located 17 km south of Kasumkent. Khtun is the nearest rural locality.

References 

Rural localities in Suleyman-Stalsky District